Lai King Estate is a public housing estate in Lai King, Kwai Chung, New Territories, Hong Kong and is one of the oldest public housing estates in Kwai Tsing District. It is divided into two phases and consists of a total of eight residential buildings completed in 1975 (Phase 1), 1976 (Phase 2) and 2022 (Heng King House) respectively. Lai King station is located between the two phases.

Yuet Lai Court and Yin Lai Court are Home Ownership Scheme housing courts in Kwai Chung near Lai King Estate, built in 1981 and 1991 respectively.

Houses

Lai King Estate

Yuet Lai Court

Yin Lai Court

Demographics
According to the 2021 Census, Lai King Estate had a population of 10,530. The median age was 53.1 and the majority of residents (97 per cent) were of Chinese ethnicity. The average household size was 2.6 people. The median monthly domestic household income stood at HK$17,910, whereas the median monthly household income for economically active households was HK$23,540.

Politics
Lai King Estate, Yuet Lai Court and Yin Lai Court are located in Lai King constituency of the Kwai Tsing District Council. It was formerly represented by Wong Tin-yan, who was elected in the 2019 elections until July 2021.

See also

Public housing estates in Kwai Chung

References

Residential buildings completed in 1975
Residential buildings completed in 1976
Kwai Chung
Lai King
Public housing estates in Hong Kong